Eric Lisle James (21 October 1881 – 28 August 1948) was an Australian cricketer who played a single first-class match for Tasmania. Born in Low Head, Tasmania, James's only recorded matches came during the 1903–04 season. In December 1903, he played for "North" in the first of two "North v South" matches for the season, held at the NTCA Ground in Launceston. He also played in the return fixture, held in April 1904 at the TCA Ground in Hobart. James's only match at state level came against the touring Marylebone Cricket Club in January 1904, as part of the English team's 1903–04 tour of Australia. In the match, played in Launceston, he scored four runs in his only innings before being bowled by George Hirst, and failed to take a wicket whilst bowling. James died in Malvern, Victoria (a suburb of Melbourne), in August 1948.

See also
 List of Tasmanian representative cricketers

References

1881 births
1948 deaths
Australian cricketers
Cricketers from Tasmania
Tasmania cricketers